Carpenters Perform Carpenter is a 2003 compilation album by Carpenters. The album comprises songs written or co-written by Richard Carpenter. It featured many lesser-known songs (similar to Reflections, released in 1998) and also included some hits such as "Top of the World" and "Yesterday Once More".

Track listings

References 

The Carpenters compilation albums
2003 compilation albums